The Longhorn Spurs form a high ridge,  long, extending north from the Prince Olav Mountains of Antarctica between Massam Glacier and Barrett Glacier to the edge of the Ross Ice Shelf. A series of rock spurs extend from the west side. The ridge was visited and so named by the Texas Tech Shackleton Glacier Party (1964–65) because of the resemblance of the spurs to the horns of longhorn cattle.

References

Ridges of Antarctica
Dufek Coast